Alfred Quill (born 1910, in Sydney) was an Australian soccer player and played for the Australia national team. Often considered one of the best soccer players in New South Wales, he scored 868 goals in all NSW competitions in his 24-year senior career.

Early career
Alf first showed his signs as a footballer, whilst attending Globe Public School. At the age of 12, Alf represented New South Wales as a schoolboy against  Victoria, South Australia and Queensland. For 3 seasons Alf played for Wentworth Juniors before joining the senior side of Pyrmont.

Club career
Beginning in his teens, Quill played 24 seasons.

Pyrmont
He began his career with Pyrmont at age 17 in the New South Wales State League in 1927.

Leichhardt-Annandale
While contracted at Leichhardt-Annandale, English club Bolton Wanderers wanted to sign Quill on 25 April 1931, which was rejected.

Wallsend
He made a return to Wallsend on a three-year contract on 6 January 1937. Quill did not have any intentions on leaving Wallsend at the end of the 1939 season, as he signed a form to stay with Wallsend. At the start of the 1943 season, he left Wallsend top play for Lake Macquarie, and returned to Wallsend on 22 May 1943 to play the remainder of the season. He proposed a retirement from football at the end of the 1945 season. He came back to Wallsend's squad in April 1946 to play a home match against Lysaght's-Orb the next week. In the 1937 season, he scored a record 70 goals for Wallsend as a state record for most goals in a season. Over his career he scored over 800 goals in league and cup matches.

International career
Quill played twice in full international matches for Australia, both against India in September 1938.

Career statistics

Club

International

Coaching career
After finishing playing he coached Wallsend before a stint as coach of Australia.

Honours
 NSW State League: 1932, 1933, 1938, 1941, 1942, 1943, 1944
 NSW State League Cup: 1937, 1942, 1944
 NSW Robinson Cup: 1938, 1939
 NSW Daniels Cup: 1940, 1941, 1942, 1943, 1949

Individual
NSW Top Scorer: 1932, 1933, 1936, 1937, 1938, 1939, 1943, 1945

References

Australian soccer players
1910 births
Year of death missing
Association football forwards
Australia international soccer players
Sport Australia Hall of Fame inductees